Riyad Karim Mahrez (born 21 February 1991) is a professional footballer who plays as a winger for  club Manchester City and captains the Algeria national team.

Mahrez began his career as a youth player for French club AAS Sarcelles. He turned professional in 2009 with Quimper, where he played for only one season before moving to Le Havre, spending a total of three years with them, initially playing for their reserve team and then becoming a first-team regular. In January 2014, Mahrez signed for English side Leicester City, helping them win the Championship and promotion to the Premier League at the end of his first season. In the 2015–16 season he was the Algerian Footballer of the Year, the PFA Players' Player of the Year, and was a member of the Premier League PFA Team of the Year as he helped Leicester City win the Premier League. He signed for Manchester City in 2018, winning the Premier League, FA Cup and EFL Cup in his first season.

Born in France, Mahrez made his international debut for Algeria in 2014 and represented them at the 2014 FIFA World Cup and at the Africa Cup of Nations in 2015, 2017, 2019 and 2021, winning the 2019 tournament. In 2016 he was named CAF's African Footballer of the Year.

Early life
Mahrez was born in Sarcelles, France, to an Algerian father and a mother of Algerian and Moroccan descent. His father Ahmed was from Beni Snous, Tlemcen District. Growing up, Mahrez would regularly spend his holidays in Algeria. His childhood friends included fellow footballers such as Wissam Ben Yedder.

Mahrez's father had played football in Algeria. When Mahrez was fifteen, his father died of a heart attack. He reflected that "I don't know if I started to be more serious but after the death of my dad things started to go for me. Maybe in my head, I wanted it more".

Club career

Early career
Although often overlooked by teams due to his slender build, Mahrez developed ball skills that brought him attention.

He joined AAS Sarcelles in 2004. He had a two-month trial at Scottish club St Mirren, but left due to the cold weather.

In 2009, Mahrez joined CFA side Quimper from AAS Sarcelles, making 22 appearances and scoring 2 goals in his first season with the club. While playing for Quimper he lived with Mathias Pogba.

He joined Le Havre in 2010, turning down offers from leading French teams Paris Saint-Germain and Marseille to join them, being enticed by their youth system. He initially played for their reserve team, Le Havre II, before going on to play 60 times and score 6 goals for the first team in the French Ligue 2 from 2011 until leaving in January 2014. He criticised Ligue 2 for what he saw as a reliance on defence and teams aiming for a goalless draw in every match.

Leicester City

2013–14 season
While Mahrez was playing for Le Havre, English Championship club Leicester City's scout Steve Walsh was monitoring teammate Ryan Mendes, but was instead impressed by Mahrez. Mahrez had never heard of Leicester, whom he initially presumed to be a rugby club. On 11 January 2014, he was signed by Leicester City on a three-and-a-half-year contract for around £450,000. His friends and family were initially sceptical of a move to English football due to its physical nature, believing that his style of play would be more suited to Spain.

Mahrez made his debut on 25 January 2014, coming on in the 79th minute as a substitute replacing fellow winger Lloyd Dyer, in the 2–0 win against Middlesbrough. After making four substitute appearances for Leicester, including scoring his first goal for the club, an 82nd-minute equaliser against local rivals Nottingham Forest, manager Nigel Pearson announced in February 2014 that he thought Mahrez was ready to start games. Leicester ended the season as winners of the Championship, returning to the Premier League for the first time in ten years.

2014–15 season
Mahrez made his Premier League debut on 16 August 2014, and scored his first goal in the division on 4 October 2014 in a 2–2 draw with Burnley. Mahrez was part of the Leicester team that won seven of its final nine matches of the season to avoid relegation to the Football League. He scored both goals in a 2–0 defeat of Southampton on 9 May and ended the season with four goals and three assists from 30 appearances.

2015–16 season
He signed a new four-year contract with Leicester in August 2015. On 8 August 2015, Mahrez scored two goals in the season opener against Sunderland in a 4–2 home win. He was later described as the club's "match winner" by captain Wes Morgan, following "superb form" which saw him score four goals in the first three games of the season.

After scoring four goals in the opening four games of the 2015–16 season, Mahrez was nominated for the Premier League Player of the Month award. By 3 November 2015, he had scored seven goals in 10 Premier League games. On 5 December, Mahrez scored a hat-trick as Leicester defeated Swansea City 3–0 to go top of the Premier League, putting him on ten league goals for the season and making him the first Algerian to score a Premier League hat-trick. Mahrez and his midfield partners Marc Albrighton, N'Golo Kanté and Danny Drinkwater received plaudits for their part in Leicester's early season run of form, and manager Claudio Ranieri described Mahrez and forward Jamie Vardy as "priceless" ahead of the January transfer window.

In January 2016 Mahrez's transfer value was said to have risen from £4.5 million to £30.1 million, ranking him among the top 50 most valuable players in Europe. In the same year, Mahrez's popularity in his homeland led Leicester to have over almost three times as many Facebook fans in Algeria than in the UK. The barbershop in Sarcelles that he frequented from his childhood became a destination for fans from as far as Belgium, desiring the same haircut.

Mahrez was one of four Leicester players named in the PFA Team of the Year in April 2016, and later that month he won the PFA Players' Player of the Year award. He was the first African to earn the accolade. When Leicester finished the season as champions, Mahrez became the first Algerian to win a Premier League medal.

2016–17 season

He signed a new four-year contract with Leicester in August 2016. He was nominated for the Ballon d'Or in October 2016, finishing seventh. He won the BBC African Footballer of the Year award in December 2016. Mahrez did not offer a big season especially with the decline in the level of Leicester, but helped the team's arrival in the quarter-finals of the Champions League for the first time, scoring four goals and two assists. On 6 May, Mahrez played his 100th Premier League game for Leicester, against Watford, scoring in the process.

2017–18 season
At the end of the 2016–17 season, Mahrez announced that he wished to leave the club. Following the announcement, Arsenal manager Arsène Wenger stated his interest in signing Mahrez, and Italian side Roma had a bid for Mahrez rejected in July 2017. In August 2017 he spoke of his "focus" despite his uncertain future at the club. The Algerian Football Federation reported on 31 August, the last day of the transfer window, that it had allowed him to leave the national team and travel quickly to Europe in order to complete his transfer to an interested club; this transfer did not materialise. In January 2018 he again asked for a transfer away from the club. After a move to Manchester City fell through, Mahrez stopped attending training at Leicester. His behaviour was criticised by commentator and former player Chris Sutton. Mahrez was critical about the "untrue assumptions" about his absence from the team, and later thanked his teammates for their support.

Manchester City

2018–19 season
On 10 July 2018, Manchester City confirmed the signing of Mahrez on a five-year contract. The transfer fee of £60m made Mahrez the most expensive African footballer, and also Manchester City's most expensive signing and a record transfer fee received by Leicester City. He stated he wanted to win the Champions League with the club. He made his debut as a starter on 5 August, as City defeated Chelsea 2–0 to win the 2018 FA Community Shield at Wembley Stadium. On 22 September 2018, coming on as a substitute in the 61st minute Mahrez scored a brace for the Citizens against Cardiff City, The first goal was his first with Manchester City.

On 29 October 2018, Mahrez scored the only goal for Manchester City in a 1–0 away victory against Tottenham Hotspur. He dedicated the goal to Vichai Srivaddhanaprabha, the former owner of his previous club Leicester City, who had recently died in a helicopter crash. On 24 February 2019, Mahrez won his second title with Manchester City by winning the EFL Cup against Chelsea, also won the best player of the EFL Cup although he did not participate in the final.

At the end of his first season with Manchester City, despite having "limited playing time" (including just 14 league starts), Mahrez won the Premier League title for the second time, and his first with Manchester City, becoming the second African player to win the title with two different clubs after Kolo Touré. Mahrez said he would not leave City despite his lack of game time, claiming that he knew his first season would be difficult and he had come to a stable team with good players but he trusted his potential. A week after in the FA Cup final, he achieved his fourth title of the season after beating Watford 6–0 becoming the first African player to complete an English domestic treble, as he earlier won the 2018–19 EFL Cup and the 2018–19 Premier League.

2019–20 season
In August 2019, Mahrez missed the 2019 FA Community Shield over concerns about medicine he had been given by the Algerian national team. The Algerian FA described it as a "non-event". Mahrez later started in Manchester City's 5–0 opening day away win against West Ham United, being involved in all 5 of his side's goals, providing two assists for hat-trick scorer Raheem Sterling and winning a penalty for Sergio Agüero to eventually score after a retake.

2020–21 season
On 28 November 2020, Mahrez scored his first hat-trick for City in a 5–0 home league win over Burnley. On 4 May 2021, Mahrez scored both goals in a 2–0 home win over Paris Saint-Germain in the second leg of the Champions League semi-finals, and by scoring via a direct free kick in a 2–1 away win a week earlier, he led City through to the first European Cup final in the club's history.

2022–23 season 
On 15 July 2022, Manchester City announced Mahrez had signed a two-year contract extension which will see him stay with the club until 2025.

International career

In November 2013, the French-born Mahrez expressed his desire to represent Algeria internationally. He was called up to the provisional Algeria squad for the 2014 FIFA World Cup. On 31 May 2014, Mahrez made his international debut for the Desert Foxes as a starter in a pre-World Cup friendly match against Armenia, and he was subsequently called up to the full squad for the tournament on 2 June. The Algerian media were critical of his inclusion and alleged that he had paid manager Vahid Halilhodžić for a place in the squad. Mahrez played in the opening group game against Belgium, then was dropped for the remainder of the tournament, in which Algeria reached the last 16.

On 15 October 2014, Mahrez scored his first international goal, as well as setting up Islam Slimani in Algeria's 3–0, Africa Cup of Nations qualifier against Malawi. In December 2014 he was announced as a member of Algeria's squad for the final tournament in Equatorial Guinea for the first time. his first meeting was against South Africa where he participated in the 60 minutes before the change in the second throw against Ghana substitute in the last 20 minutes where the Algerian team were defeated by a single goal in their last game in the group stage against Senegal led Mahrez the national team to the quarter-finals, scoring the first goal of a match ending 2–0. then against Ivory Coast gave assists for El Arabi Hillel Soudani were not enough to exclude from the quarter-finals 3–1. then in the second Round of the 2018 World Cup qualifier against Tanzania helped Mahrez in the team qualified for the group stage where he scored a goal and assists for Carl Medjani.

Mahrez was named in coach Georges Leekens' Algeria squad for the 2017 Africa Cup of Nations in Gabon. In their opening game, he scored both goals in a 2–2 draw with Zimbabwe and was awarded Man of the Match.

In October 2017, with Algeria's chances of reaching the 2018 FIFA World Cup already ended, Mahrez and his (at the time) Leicester teammate Islam Slimani were dropped from the national team, with coach Lucas Alcaraz selecting several new players. On 18 November 2018, in the 2019 Africa Cup of Nations qualifier Mahrez scored a brace in a 4–1 away victory against Togo, his first goal with the national team since 2017 Africa Cup of Nations to lead Algeria to qualify for the 2019 Africa Cup of Nations.

In May 2019, he was named to Algeria's 23-man squad for the 2019 Africa Cup of Nations. By the decision of coach Djamel Belmadi, Mahrez was chosen to be captain of Algeria at the Africa Cup of Nations. Mahrez scored a 90+5 minute goal in a 2–1 win against Nigeria in the semi-finals of the competition. Later on, Algeria managed to win the tournament which was their first since 1990.

Mahrez captained Algeria at the delayed 2021 Africa Cup of Nations, held in January 2022.

Style of play
A left-footed player, Mahrez usually plays as a right winger, a position which allows him to cut inside and shoot on goal with his stronger foot, or make deliveries into the penalty area; however, he is a versatile player, who is capable of playing anywhere across the front line, in a central role as an attacking midfielder, as a winger on either flank, or even in a centre-forward role as a false 9. A quick, creative and technically gifted player, his main traits are his trickery, balance, turn of pace, flair and dribbling skills. Although he is capable of scoring goals, he is also an excellent assist provider, courtesy of his ability to create chances for his teammates. Despite his ability, however, his record from the penalty spot has been inconsistent throughout his career. In his youth, he was noted for his ball skills, but was often overlooked due to his slender build; when Quimper's youth manager Ronan Salaün and his assistant Mickaël Pellen first noticed Mahrez, they commented that he was talented, a good set-piece taker, and he possessed excellent technique and dribbling skills with both feet, but that he was very slim and was lacking in the tactical aspect of the game, as he played primarily by instinct, having grown up playing street football; as such, after signing him, Salaün advised Mahrez to use his intelligence to avoid challenges, as he believed that he was not strong enough to withstand physical tackles. Leicester's former head of recruitment, Steve Walsh noted upon observing Mahrez play that: "Riyad was a bit raw but he had a great touch. He could kill the ball dead and go past people. I liked his positivity. Some of his decision-making wasn't that great and defensively he wasn't the best, but you could see that he had real talent." Mahrez has credited his former Leicester manager Claudio Ranieri for helping him to develop the tactical aspect of his game. During his time at Manchester City under manager Pep Guardiola, Mahrez was also able to improve his defensive skills and work-rate, as well as his decision-making. Mahrez has developed his own special skill move dubbed as "La spéciale", in which he fakes a shot with his left foot, then he flicks the ball behind the right foot to dribble past his opponent.

Mahrez has been regarded as one of the best wingers in world football.

Personal life
Mahrez married his English girlfriend, Rita Johal, in 2015. Their daughter was born later that year. In June 2019, the couple, who by that time had two daughters, were ordered to pay a former nanny more than £3,600 in unpaid wages. In October 2020, it was confirmed that Mahrez is now in a relationship with model Taylor Ward after splitting from Johal. They announced their engagement on 21 June 2021. The couple had a daughter in July 2022.

Mahrez is a practising Muslim. In June 2017, he made the Umrah pilgrimage to Mecca.

In May 2020, Mahrez lost hundreds of thousands of pounds' worth of valuables after his penthouse apartment in Manchester was burgled.

Career statistics

Club

International

As of match played 16 November 2022. Scores and results list Algeria's goal tally first, score column indicates score after each Mahrez goal.

Honours
Leicester City
Premier League: 2015–16
Football League Championship: 2013–14

Manchester City
Premier League: 2018–19, 2020–21, 2021–22
FA Cup: 2018–19
EFL Cup: 2018–19, 2019–20, 2020–21
FA Community Shield: 2018
UEFA Champions League runner-up: 2020–21

Algeria
Africa Cup of Nations: 2019

Individual

CAF African Footballer of the Year: 2016
BBC African Footballer of the Year: 2016
Algerian Footballer of the Year: 2015, 2016
PFA Team of the Year: 2015–16 Premier League
PFA Players' Player of the Year: 2015–16
PFA Fans' Player of the Year: 2015–16
Leicester City Player of the Year: 2015–16
El Heddaf Arab Footballer of the Year: 2016
Lion d'Or African Footballer of the Year: 2016
CAF Team of the Year: 2016, 2018, 2019
CAF Africa Cup of Nations Team of the Tournament: 2019
African Goal of the Year: 2019
IFFHS CAF Men Team of The Year: 2020
IFFHS CAF Men's Team of the Decade 2011–2020
Manchester City Player of the Month: October 2018, September 2019, December 2019, February 2021, February 2022, December 2022 January 2023
PFA Fans' Player of the Month: March 2021 January 2023
Alan Hardaker Trophy: 2021
IFFHS CAF World's Best Playmaker: 2021

See also

References

External links

Riyaz Mahrez profile at the Manchester City F.C. website

1991 births
Living people
People from Sarcelles
Footballers from Val-d'Oise
Algerian footballers
Algeria international footballers
French footballers
Association football midfielders
Association football wingers
Quimper Kerfeunteun F.C. players
Le Havre AC players
Leicester City F.C. players
Manchester City F.C. players
Championnat National 2 players
Ligue 2 players
English Football League players
Premier League players
FA Cup Final players
2014 FIFA World Cup players
2015 Africa Cup of Nations players
2017 Africa Cup of Nations players
2019 Africa Cup of Nations players
2021 Africa Cup of Nations players
Africa Cup of Nations-winning players
Algerian expatriate footballers
French expatriate footballers
Expatriate footballers in England
French expatriate sportspeople in England
Algerian expatriate sportspeople in England
Algerian people of Moroccan descent
French sportspeople of Algerian descent
French sportspeople of Moroccan descent
Algerian Muslims
French Muslims